Events from the year 2002 in the United States.

Incumbents

Federal government 
 President: George W. Bush (R-Texas)
 Vice President: Dick Cheney (R-Wyoming)
 Chief Justice: William Rehnquist (Wisconsin)  
 Speaker of the House of Representatives: Dennis Hastert  (R-Illinois)
 Senate Majority Leader: Tom Daschle (D-South Dakota)
 Congress: 107th

Events

January 

 January 5 – Charles Bishop, a 15-year-old student pilot, crashes a light aircraft into a building in Tampa, Florida, evoking fear of a copycat 9/11 terrorist attack.
 January 6 – The Boston Globe publishes a story detailing the Catholic Archdiocese of Boston sex abuse scandal.
 January 8 – The No Child Left Behind Act is signed into law by U.S. President George W. Bush.
 January 9 – The United States Department of Justice announces it will pursue a criminal investigation of Enron.
 January 11 – The first detainees arrive at Camp X-Ray (Guantanamo).
January 13 – President Bush chokes on a pretzel and faints briefly.
 January 14 – The asylum case of Adelaide Abankwah is heard in New York.
 January 16
 The United Nations Security Council unanimously establishes an arms embargo and the freezing of assets of Osama bin Laden, al-Qaeda and the remaining members of the Taliban.
 A student shoots six at the Appalachian School of Law in Grundy, Virginia, killing 3.
 January 18 – A Canadian Pacific Railway train carrying anhydrous ammonia derails outside of Minot, North Dakota, killing one.
 January 21 – Cyberchase premieres on PBS Kids.
 January 23 – The Wall Street Journal reporter Daniel Pearl is kidnapped in Pakistan, accused of being a CIA agent by his captors.
 January 29 – In his State of the Union Address, President Bush describes North Korea, Iran and Iraq as an "axis of evil".
 January 31 – U.S. special forces are deployed in the Philippines in Operation Enduring Freedom – Philippines, part of the War on Terror.

February 

 February 1 – Kidnapped reporter Daniel Pearl of The Wall Street Journal is murdered in Karachi, Pakistan.
 February 3 – Super Bowl XXXVI: The New England Patriots beat the St. Louis Rams 20–17 in New Orleans.
 February 8–February 24 – The Winter Olympics are held in Salt Lake City, Utah. The U.S. wins 10 gold, 13 silver and 11 bronze medals.
 February 12 – The U.S. Secretary of Energy makes the decision that Yucca Mountain is suitable to be the United States' nuclear repository.
 February 13 – Queen Elizabeth II gives former New York City mayor Rudolph Giuliani an honorary knighthood.
 February 19 – NASA's Mars Odyssey space probe begins to map the surface of Mars using its thermal emission imaging system.

March 
 March 1
 STS-109: Space Shuttle Columbia flies the Hubble Space Telescope service mission, its last before the disastrous STS-107.
 U.S. invasion of Afghanistan: In eastern Afghanistan, Operation Anaconda begins.
 March 12 – In Houston, Texas, Andrea Yates is found guilty of drowning her five children on June 20, 2001. She is later sentenced to life in prison.
 March 14 – 125 vehicles are involved in a massive pile up on Interstate 75 in Ringgold, Georgia.
 March 15 – Ice Age is released in theaters.
 March 19 – US war in Afghanistan: Operation Anaconda ends (started on March 1) after killing 500 Taliban and al Qaeda fighters, with 11 allied troop fatalities.
 March 21 – In Pakistan, Ahmed Omar Saeed Sheikh and three others are charged with the kidnapping and killing of The Wall Street Journal reporter Daniel Pearl.
 March 24 – The 74th Academy Awards, hosted by Whoopi Goldberg, are held at Kodak Theatre in Hollywood, with Ron Howard's A Beautiful Mind winning four awards, including Best Picture and Best Director. The film ties with Peter Jackson's The Lord of the Rings: The Fellowship of the Ring in award wins, while the latter leads the nominations with 13. The telecast garners over 41.8 million viewers.
 March – Layalina Productions, Inc. non-profit public diplomacy initiative is inaugurated.

April 
 April 1 – Maryland defeats Indiana 64–52 to win the NCAA Men's Basketball Championship at the Georgia Dome in Atlanta, Georgia.
 April 17 – Four Canadian infantrymen are killed in Afghanistan by friendly fire from two US F-16s.
 April 19 – The Senate defeats President Bush's plan to authorize oil exploration in the Arctic National Wildlife Refuge.
 April 27 – The Laughlin, Nevada River Run Riot kills three.

May 

 May 1 – Nicktoons TV (renamed Nicktoons in 2003, then in 2009) launches in the United States.
 May 3 – Spider-Man is released in theaters as the first film in the Spider-Man trilogy.
 May 10 – FBI agent Robert Hanssen is sentenced to life imprisonment without the possibility of parole for selling American secrets to Moscow for $1.4 million in cash and diamonds.
 May 12 – Former U.S. President Jimmy Carter arrives in Cuba for a five-day visit with Fidel Castro, becoming the first U.S. president, in or out of office, to visit the island since Castro's 1959 revolution.
 May 16 – Star Wars: Episode II – Attack of the Clones is released in theaters.
 May 21 – The State Department releases a report naming seven state sponsors of terrorism: Iran, Iraq, Cuba, Libya, North Korea, Sudan and Syria.
 May 22
 16th Street Baptist Church bombing: A jury in Birmingham, Alabama convicts Ku Klux Klan member Bobby Frank Cherry of the 1963 murders of four girls.
 Police in Washington, D.C. announce that the skeletal remains of Federal Bureau of Prisons intern Chandra Levy, who has been missing for a year, have been found in Rock Creek Park.
 May 26 – I-40 bridge disaster: A barge collides with the Interstate 40 bridge across the Arkansas River in eastern Oklahoma, killing 14.

June 
 June 5 – 14-year-old Elizabeth Smart is kidnapped from her bedroom in Salt Lake City, Utah. She is rescued nine months later.
 June 11 – The first episode of American Idol airs.
 June 11 – Antonio Meucci is recognized as the first inventor of the telephone by the United States Congress.
 June 14 – In Karachi, Pakistan, a car bomb in front of the U.S. Consulate kills 12 Pakistanis and injures 50.
 June 21 – Walt Disney Pictures' 42nd feature film, Lilo & Stitch, is released to positive reviews and box-office success.
 June 29 – Vice President Dick Cheney serves as acting president for a few hours while President George W. Bush undergoes a colonoscopy procedure under sedation.

July 
 July 4 – 2002 Los Angeles International Airport shooting: Egyptian immigrant Hesham Mohamed Hadayet kills two and injures six before being killed by a security officer. The incident is called an act of terrorism.
 July 13 – A lightning strike sets off the Sour Biscuit Fire in Oregon and northern California, which burns 499,570 acres (2,022 km2).
 July 15 – In Washington, D.C., "American Taliban" John Walker Lindh pleads guilty to aiding the enemy and possession of explosives during the commission of a felony; Lindh agrees to serve 10 years in prison for each charge.
 July 21 – Telecommunications giant WorldCom files for Chapter 11 bankruptcy protection, the largest such filing in United States history.

August 
 August 12 – In Arlington, Virginia, US Airways declares bankruptcy.

September 
 September 2 – Liberty's Kids premieres on PBS Kids.
 September 4 – Kelly Clarkson wins the first American Idol competition.
 September 5 – The Sour Biscuit Fire in Oregon and northern California, which burned 499,570 acres (2,022 km2), is contained.
 September 7 – The Fox Network's Fox Kids block (which had been on the air since 1990) airs for the final time. It was replaced the following week (on September 14) by the 4Kids-programmed FoxBox.
 September 11 – Thousands of people in New York City and across the nation attend ceremonies as the United States commemorates the first anniversary of the 9/11 attacks.
 September 12 – Iraq disarmament crisis: U.S. President George W. Bush addresses the U.N., and challenges its members to confront the "grave and gathering danger" of Iraq, or stand aside as the United States and likeminded nations act.
 September 14 – Major upheavals take place on Saturday mornings, as the four major networks change their programming on this day. Fox, having sold Fox Kids Worldwide to The Walt Disney Company the previous year, ends Fox Kids and sells its airtime to 4Kids Entertainment, who begin programming a new children's programming block as the Fox Box. Disney, meanwhile, having acquired the Fox Kids brand, ends Disney's One Saturday Morning on ABC and renamed ABC Kids. CBS, whose then-corporate sibling Nickelodeon programs its lineup, rebrands its Nick Jr. on CBS block as Nick on CBS and refocuses it on children 2–11 years old, while NBC signs a contract with Discovery Networks to air a programming strand called Discovery Kids on NBC (a spinoff of a former digital cable channel Discovery Kids), which replaces the teen-oriented block TNBC.

October 
 October 2
 The Beltway sniper attacks begin with five shootings taking place in Montgomery County, Maryland.
 The Congress of the United States passes a joint resolution, which authorizes the President to use the United States Armed Forces as he deems necessary and appropriate, against Iraq.
 October 9 – The Dot-com bubble bear market reaches bottom, when the Dow Jones Industrial Average slips below 7,200.
 October 9–10 – Congress passes the Iraq Resolution authorizing the Iraq War.
 October 16 – The Iraq War Resolution is authorized by a majority of the U.S. Congress.
 October 24 – The Beltway sniper attacks end with the arrest of John Allen Muhammad and Lee Boyd Malvo. The pair killed 10 people and wounded three others in the Baltimore–Washington Metropolitan Area in this series of attacks; they had killed seven other people in prior attacks. 
 October 25 – U.S. Senator Paul Wellstone, his family, and his staff are killed in a plane accident at Eveleth, Minnesota.
 October 27 – The Anaheim Angels defeat the San Francisco Giants in Game 7 of the 2002 World Series to win the title.

November 

 November 2 – The Godless Americans March on Washington brings together 2,000 atheists, freethinkers, agnostics, and humanists in a mile-long parade down the National Mall.
 November 3 – The 7.9  Denali earthquake shakes the Alaska Interior with a maximum Mercalli intensity of IX (Violent), causing one injury and $20–56 million in losses.
 November 5 – Republicans gain a majority in the Senate and a larger majority in the House of Representatives following congressional elections.
 November 6 – The U.S. Federal Reserve System drops its primary discount rate by 25 basis points to 0.75%, putting the real interest rate solidly below the inflation rate.
 November 7 – Iran bans the advertising of United States products.
 November 8 – The United Nations passes Resolution 1441 giving Iraqi President Saddam Hussein a final opportunity to cooperate with international weapons inspectors.
 November 12 – Toxicologist Kristin Rossum is convicted of the 2000 murder of her husband Gregory de Viller in San Diego. Rossum had poisoned her victim using fentanyl, passing off the crime as a suicide.
 November 16 – A Campaign against Climate Change march takes place in London from Lincoln's Inn Fields, past Esso offices to the United States Embassy.
 November 25 – U.S. President George W. Bush signs the Homeland Security Act into law, establishing the Department of Homeland Security. It was the largest U.S. government reorganization since the creation of the Department of Defense in 1947.
 November 27 – Walt Disney Pictures' 43rd feature film, Treasure Planet, is released to positive reception, but turns outs to be a rare box office bomb from the studio.

December 
 December 9 – United Airlines, the second largest airline in the world, files for bankruptcy.
 December 13 – President George W. Bush announces a smallpox vaccination program for military personnel, as well as for civilian healthcare and emergency workers to protect against bioterrorism risks. He announces that the public will not be called up for shots until 2004 at the earliest.
 December 21 – President Bush receives his smallpox vaccine.

Ongoing 
 Iraqi no-fly zones (1991–2003)
 War in Afghanistan (2001–2021)

Full date unknown 
Nutrisoda company is founded in Illinois.

Packsize manufacturer is founded in Utah.
Swivler manufacturing company is founded in Woodland, Washington.

Births

January 
 January 20 – Michael Barbieri, actor
 January 25 – Lil Mosey, rapper

February 
 February 5 – Davis Cleveland, actor
 February 13 – Sophia Lillis, actress
 February 26 – Kendra and Maliyah Herrin, conjoined twins

March 
 March 4 – Jacob Hopkins, actor
 March 15 – Sam McCarthy, actor

April 
 April 8 
 Skai Jackson, actress
 Ken San Jose, Filipino-American dancer
 April 10 – Ava Michelle, actress, dancer, and model
 April 16 – Sadie Sink, actress
 April 18 – Noah Thompson, singer
 April 19 – Loren Gray, social media personality
 April 24 – Skylar Stecker, singer and actress
 April 25 – Eitan Bernath, social media personality

May 
 May 6 – Emily Alyn Lind, actress
 May 9 – Cree Cicchino, actress
 May 15 – Chase Hudson, social media influencer

June 
 June 2 – Madison Hu, actress
 June 3 – Eva Bella, voice of young Elsa in the Disney movie Frozen  
 June 25 – Tamir Rice, African-American boy killed by police (d. 2014)
 June 26 – Chandler Smith, race car driver
 June 29 – Marlhy Murphy, musician, actress and media personality

July 
 July 24 – Benjamin Flores Jr., actor and rapper

August 
 August 1 – Oona Laurence, actress
 August 6 – Nessa Barrett, singer
 August 9 – Wan Kuzri Wan Kamal, Malaysian footballer
 August 16 – Talia Ryder, actress
 August 19 – Brighton Sharbino, actress
 August 26 – Lil Tecca, rapper
 August 30 – Grant Palmer, actor

September 
 September 6 – Asher Angel, actor
 September 8 – Gaten Matarazzo, actor
 September 15 – Rhema Marvanne, singer
 September 27 – Jenna Ortega, actress
 September 30 – Maddie Ziegler, dancer

October 
 October 2 – Jacob Sartorius, singer
 October 6 – Rio Mangini, actor
 October 15 – Malu Trevejo, Cuban-American social media personality  
 October 16 – Madison Wolfe, actress
 October 25 – Johnny Sequoyah, actress
 October 26 – Emma Schweiger, actress

November 
 November 1 – NLE Choppa, rapper
 November 12 – Paolo Banchero, American-Italian basketball player
 November 13 – Nikki Hahn, actress
 November 13 – Giovanni Reyna, soccer player
 November 14 – Ben Bowen, notable victim (d. 2005)
 November 20 – Madisyn Shipman, actress
 November 26 – Baylee Littrell, singer
 November 30 – Emily Skinner, child actress

December 
 December 30 – Bugha, esports athlete

Full date unknown

Deaths

January 

 January 1 
 Carol Ohmart, actress (b. 1927)
 Julia Phillips, movie producer (b. 1944)
 January 3 – Miki Dora, surfer (b. 1934)
 January 4 – Nathan Chapman, soldier (b. 1970)
 January 6 – John W. Reynolds Jr., politician and jurist (b. 1921)
 January 7 – Mighty Igor, wrestler (b. 1931)
 January 8 – Dave Thomas, businessman (b. 1932)
 January 9 – K. William Stinson, politician (b. 1930)
 January 10 – John Buscema, comic book artist (b. 1927)
 January 12
 Ernest Pintoff, animator (b. 1931)
 Cyrus Vance, lawyer and Secretary of State (b. 1917)
 January 13 – Ted Demme, film and television director and producer (b. 1963)
 January 14 – Edith Bouvier Beale, socialite (b. 1917)
 January 15 – Michael Bilandic, politician, Mayor of Chicago (b. 1923)
 January 16
 Bobo Olson, boxer (b. 1928)
 Ron Taylor, actor (b. 1952)
 January 18 – Marilyn Harris, writer (b. 1931)
 January 20 – Carrie Hamilton, actress and daughter of Carol Burnett (b. 1963)
 January 22 
Peggy Lee, singer and actress (b. 1920)
Stanley Marcus, businessman and author (b. 1905)
 January 23 – Robert Nozick, philosopher (b. 1938)
 January 25 – Rudolph B. Davila, Army officer (b. 1916)
 January 28 – Dick "Night Train" Lane, American football player (b. 1928)

February 

 February 1
 Irish McCalla, actress (b. 1928)
 Daniel Pearl, journalist and murder victim, died in Karachi, Pakistan (b. 1963)
 February 2 – Paul Baloff, singer (b. 1960)
 February 4 – Helen Dodson Prince, astronomer (b. 1905)
 February 6 – Guy Stockwell, actor (b. 1933)
 February 7
 Elisa Bridges, actress and model (b. 1973)
 Ellen Demming, actress (b. 1922)
 February 8 – Nick Brignola, jazz musician (b. 1936)
 February 9 – Fred Gehrke, football player (b. 1918)
 February 10 
 Jim Spencer, baseball player (b. 1947)
 Dave Van Ronk, folk musician (b. 1936)
 Vernon A. Walters, Army officer and a diplomat (b. 1917)
 February 11 – George Kasem, politician (b. 1919)
 February 13 – Waylon Jennings, American country singer (b. 1937)   
 February 15 – Howard K. Smith, television journalist (b. 1914)
 February 18 – Jack Lambert, actor (b. 1920)
 February 19 – Virginia Hamilton, writer (b. 1936)
 February 20 – Willie Thrower, American football player (b. 1930)
 February 22 – Chuck Jones, animator (b. 1912)
 February 24 – Leo Ornstein, Russian-born American composer and pianist (b. 1892)
 February 26 – Lawrence Tierney, actor (b. 1919)
 February 27 – Mary Stuart, actress (b. 1926)

March 

 March 1 – C. Farris Bryant, politician (b. 1914)
 March 3 – Al Pollard, football player (b. 1928)
 March 5 – Howard Cannon, politician (b. 1912)
 March 7 – Mickey Haslin, baseball player (b. 1909)
 March 9 – Irene Worth, actress (b. 1916)
 March 11 – James Tobin, Nobel economist (b. 1918)
 March 15 – Sylvester Weaver, television executive (b. 1908)
 March 17 – Rosetta LeNoire, actress (b. 1911)
 March 23 – Eileen Farrell, soprano (b. 1920)
 March 26 – Randy Castillo, musician (b. 1950)
 March 27 
 Milton Berle, comedian and actor (b. 1908)
 Billy Wilder, Austrian-born director (b. 1905)

April 

 April 5 – Layne Staley, singer and songwriter (b. 1967)
 April 7 – John Agar, actor (b. 1921)
 April 15 – Byron White, athlete and Supreme Court Justice (b. 1917)
 April 16 – Robert Urich, actor (b. 1946)
 April 18 – Wahoo McDaniel, American football player and wrestler (b. 1938)
 April 22 – Linda Lovelace, American pornographic actress (b. 1949)
 April 25 – Lisa Lopes, rapper, died in La Ceiba, Atlántida, Honduras (b. 1971)
 April 27 – George Alec Effinger, writer (b. 1947)
 April 28 – Ruth Handler, businesswoman (b. 1916)

May 
 May 9 – Dan Devine, American football player and coach (b. 1924)
 May 11 – Joseph Bonanno, mafioso (b. 1905 in Italy)
 May 17 – Dave Berg, cartoonist (b. 1920)
 May 20 – Stephen Jay Gould, paleontologist and writer (b. 1941)
 May 23 – Sam Snead, golfer (b. 1912)
 May 24 
 Susie Garrett, actress (b. 1929)
 Wallace Markfield, writer (b. 1926)
 May 28 – David Parker Ray, kidnapper and serial killer (b. 1939)

June 

 June 5 – Dee Dee Ramone, songwriter and musician (b. 1951)
 June 10 – John Gotti, murderer and leader of organized crime (b. 1940)
 June 11 – Robbin Crosby, musician (b. 1959)
 June 12 – Bill Blass, fashion designer (b. 1922)
 June 17 – Willie Davenport, track and field athlete (b. 1943)
 June 22 
 Darryl Kile, baseball player (b. 1968)
 Eppie Lederer, journalist and radio host (b. 1918)
 June 23 – Logan Tucker, murder victim (b. 1996)
 June 26 – Jay Berwanger, American football player (b. 1914)
 June 29 – Rosemary Clooney, singer and actress, and wife of José Ferrer and mother of Miguel Ferrer (b, 1928)

July 
 July 2 – Ray Brown, American bassist (b. 1926)
 July 4 – Benjamin O. Davis Jr., general (b. 1912)
 July 5 – Ted Williams, baseball player (b. 1918)
 July 6 – John Frankenheimer, film director (b. 1930)
 July 8 – Ward Kimball, animator (b. 1913)
 July 9 – Rod Steiger, actor and husband of Claire Bloom (b. 1925)
 July 10 – Laurence Janifer, writer (b. 1933)
 July 16 – John Cocke, computer scientist (b. 1925)
 July 19 – Alan Lomax, folklorist and musicologist (b. 1915)
 July 23 – Chaim Potok, writer and rabbi (b. 1929)

August 

 August 5 
 Josh Ryan Evans, American actor (b. 1982)
 Chick Hearn, American basketball announcer (b. 1916)
 August 11 – Galen Rowell, American photographer, writer, and climber (b. 1940)
 August 14 – Dave Williams, American musician (b. 1972)
 August 15 – Kyle Rote, American football player (b. 1928)
 August 16 – Jeff Corey, American actor (b. 1914)
 August 31
 Lionel Hampton, American musician (b. 1908)
 Martin Kamen, American chemist (b. 1913)

September 

 September 3 – Ted Ross, American actor (b. 1934)
 September 4 – Jerome Biffle, American athlete (b. 1928)
 September 5 – David Todd Wilkinson, American cosmologist (b. 1935)
 September 7 – Erma Franklin, American singer (b. 1938)
 September 11
 Kim Hunter, American actress (b. 1922)
 Johnny Unitas, American football player (b. 1933)
 September 14 – LaWanda Page, comedian and actress (b. 1920)
 September 18 – Bob Hayes, American football player and track and field athlete (b. 1942)
 September 21 – Robert L. Forward, writer, inventor, and physicist (b. 1932)
 September 22 – Mickey Newbury, American singer-songwriter (b. 1940)
 September 24 – Mike Webster, football player (b. 1952)

October 

 October 9 – Aileen Wuornos, American serial killer (b. 1956)
 October 10 – Teresa Graves, American actress and comedian (b. 1948)
 October 12 – Ray Conniff, musician and bandleader (b. 1916)
 October 13 – Stephen Ambrose, American historian and biographer (b. 1936)
 October 17 – Aileen Riggin, American swimmer and diver (b. 1906)
 October 23
 Adolph Green, American lyricist and playwright (b. 1914)
 Richard Helms, American CIA director (b. 1913)
 October 24 – Harry Hay, British-born American activist (b. 1912)
 October 25 – Paul Wellstone, American politician (b. 1944)
 October 28 – Margaret Booth, American film editor (b. 1898)
 October 30 – Jam Master Jay, American Hip-Hop DJ (b. 1965)

November 

 November 3 – Jonathan Harris, actor (b. 1914)
 November 9 – Merlin Santana, actor (b. 1976)
 November 14 – Eddie Bracken, actor (b. 1915)
 November 15 – Roberta Leighton, drag racer
 November 18 – James Coburn, actor (b. 1928)
 November 21 – Hadda Brooks, jazz singer, pianist, and composer (b. 1916)
 November 24 – John Rawls, philosopher (b. 1921)
 November 26 – Verne Winchell, businessman (b. 1915)

December 
 December 2 – Mal Waldron, jazz pianist, composer, and arranger (b. 1925)
 December 6
 Father Philip Berrigan, priest, member of the Plowshares Movement and political activist (b. 1923)
 Charles Rosen, pioneer in artificial intelligence (b. 1927)
 December 9 – Stan Rice, painter and poet (b. 1942)
 December 26 – Herb Ritts, photographer (b. 1952)

Full date unknown 
 Galen Schlosser, American architect

See also 
 2002 in American soccer
 2002 in American television
 List of American films of 2002
 Timeline of United States history (1990–2009)

References

External links
 

 
2000s in the United States
United States
United States
Years of the 21st century in the United States
Articles containing video clips